Hells Bells is a studio album led by American pianist John Hicks recorded in 1975 but not released on the Strata-East label until 1980. It is one of two albums to be recorded during Hicks' debut studio session as leader, the other being Steadfast, ultimately released in 1991. Hells Bells was reissued on CD by Charly Records in 1998.

Reception
Allmusic awarded the album 3 stars.

Track listing
All compositions by John Hicks except as indicated
 "Hell's Bells" (Cliff Barbaro) - 9:50
 "Avojca" - 8:17
 "Yemenja" - 10:53
 "Angie's Tune" - 9:50

Personnel
John Hicks - piano
Clint Houston - bass 
Cliff Barbaro - drums

References

Strata-East Records albums
John Hicks (jazz pianist) albums
1980 albums